Chou Kung-shin (born 14 April 1947) is a Taiwanese scholar, writer, historian and archaeologist. She served as Director of National Palace Museum from May 2008 till July 2012.

Life and career
Chou Kung-shin was born in Zhejiang on April 14, 1947. She graduated from Fu Jen Catholic University, Chinese Culture University as well as Paris-Sorbonne University. She spent 27 years working in National Palace Museum before serving as a council director of Chinese Association of Museums. She was head of Institute of Fu Jen University Museum Studies in September 2002, and held that office until May 2008. Then she became Director of National Palace Museum, and served until July 2012.

References

1947 births
Living people
Fu Jen Catholic University alumni
Chinese Culture University alumni
College of Sorbonne alumni
20th-century Taiwanese women writers
Taiwanese women historians
Taiwanese archaeologists
Directors of National Palace Museum
Taiwanese people from Zhejiang
Women museum directors
21st-century Taiwanese women writers